Andres Koern (born 13 April 1946) is an Estonian entrepreneur.

1993–2004, he was Chief Executive Officer of AS Põltsamaa Felix (:et). He has been a member of the Supervisory Board of AS Bigbank.

In 2001, he was awarded with Order of the White Star, V class.

He is honorary alumnus of the Estonian Students' Society.

References

Living people
1946 births
Estonian businesspeople